Mapungubwe National Park is a national park in Limpopo Province, South Africa. The National Park borders Mapesu Private Game Reserve to the south. It abuts on the border with Botswana and Zimbabwe, and forms part of the Greater Mapungubwe Transfrontier Conservation Area. The park protects the historical site of Mapungubwe Hill, which was the capital of the Kingdom of Mapungubwe, as well as the wildlife and riverine forests along the Limpopo River. The Mapungubwe Hill was the site of a community dating back to the Iron Age. Evidences have shown that it was a prosperous community. Archaeologists also uncovered the famous golden rhino figurine from the site. It is one of the few places in Africa that has both meerkats and Nile crocodiles.

Mapungubwe National Park is renowned for its scenic landscape, with sandstone formations, woodlands, riverine forest and baobab trees.

History

The history of the Mapungubwe Cultural Landscape dates back 210 million years ago when one of the earliest plant-eating dinosaurs, Plateosauravus (Euskelosaurus), was known to have lived in the area.

The Mapungubwe area became a focus of agricultural research in the 1920s through the efforts of the botanist Illtyd Buller Pole-Evans. Pole Evans was instrumental in the creation of the Botanical Survey Advisory Committee, which was tasked with coordinating botanical research throughout the Union of South Africa. One of the network of botanical and research stations set up by the Botanical Survey was situated in the Mapungubwe area. At the request of General Smuts, the government set aside a block of nine farms in this area as a preserve for wildlife and natural vegetation in 1918. A few years later this became known as the Dongola Botanical Reserve.

Pole Evans set about expanding the Dongola Botanical Reserve. By the early 1940s, the reserve had grown to include 27 farms, including Greefswald, the property on which the Mapungubwe Hill is situated. Pole Evans lobbied to have the reserve proclaimed as a national park, with the support of Prime Minister Jan Smuts. In 1944, Minister of Lands Andrew Conroy proposed the formation of the Dongola Wild Life Sanctuary, which would include 124 farms, 86 of which were privately owned. This proposal was strongly opposed by the National Party, then the official opposition in parliament and the National Parks Board of Trustees. In one of the longest running debates in the history of the South African parliament, supporters argued that it was necessary to conserve the country's natural assets, that the land set aside for the proposed reserve was unsuitable for agricultural purposes and that the area had a rich archaeology which should be protected. Those opposed to the establishment of the reserve argued that it was unacceptable to alienate agricultural land for wildlife conservation, to expropriate private land or to evict people from land they had occupied for generations. The debate, which has become known as the "Battle of Dongola", resulted in the declaration of a much reduced area as the Dongola Wildlife Sanctuary, after members of the ruling United Party voted in favour of the proposal. The National Party won the elections in 1948, and the sanctuary was abolished in 1949. Expropriated farms were returned to their original farmers, farms owned by the state were allocated for resettlement and funds returned to donors.

In 1967, another proposal to protect the area was initiated and the Vhembe Nature Reserve, comprising three farms, including Greefswald, was established as a Transvaal provincial reserve.

In 1993, De Beers Consolidated Mines, which had established the Venetia Limpopo Nature Reserve on land that adjoins Greefswald, called for the area to be declared a national park. In 1995 the South African National Parks Board and the Limpopo provincial government signed an agreement committing themselves to the establishment of the new national park. The Vhembe Dongola National Park was proclaimed on 9 April 1998.

The Vhembe Dongola National Park was renamed Mapungubwe National Park and opened officially on Heritage Day, 24 September 2004.
In the 21st century, Mapungubwe has been embraced as a site of significance by South Africans and the international community. The Mapungubwe National Park was declared in 1998. The Mapungubwe Cultural Landscape (MCL) was declared as a National Heritage Site in 2001 and it was inscribed on the World Heritage List in 2003.

With the park's UNESCO World Heritage Status, a building has been constructed that houses a museum section with many of the artefacts uncovered in the park on display. Information on the park's history and biology is also available at the Interpretive Centre.

Flora and fauna

Vegetation
The numerous habitat types have resulted in high species diversity.

There are at least 24 Acacia species and 8 Commiphora species, amongst others. Other vegetation of the area is a typically short fairly dense growth of shrubby Mopane trees, generally associated with a number of other trees and shrubs and a somewhat sparse and tufted grassveld. The riparian fringe of the Limpopo is of prime importance from the point of view of conservation. It is a dense vegetation community with a closed canopy which occurs in the rich alluvial deposits along the river.

The most striking trees in this community fever trees, ana trees, leadwoods, fig trees and acacias. Extensive patches of this vegetation have been cleared for cultivation elsewhere along the length of the Limpopo River. The Limpopo floodplain has allowed some trees to grow to massive sizes. Nyala berry trees and ana trees can get particularly big.

Birds

387 bird species have been recorded in Mapungubwe National Park and over 400 species occur in the region.

There is a high density of Verreaux's (black) eagle in this craggy landscape and other raptors are also prominent.

Particularly enticing is an abundance of cuckoo species in summer with up to eleven species being found, including the rarer common and thick-billed cuckoos.

An interesting attraction of the park is the occurrence of species typical of the arid western regions of the country (e.g. southern pied babbler, crimson-breasted shrike and black-faced waxbill) occur alongside species associated with the moister Lowveld habitat of the Kruger National Park .

The Limpopo Tree-top Boardwalk and hide is a magnificent facility allowing the visitor into the trees alongside the birds or looking down on those that forage on the ground and lower strata. Meyer's parrots, white-crested helmetshrikes, Meve's (longtailed) starlings and some flycatcher species will be seen. Both tropical and southern boubous occur.

The yellow-bellied greenbul, Meve's (long-tailed) starling, black-backed puffback and tropical boubou can be seen, and southern pied babbler and Natal spurfowl (francolin) are very vocal as are orange-breasted and grey-headed bush-shrikes and grey-backed camaroptera (bleating warbler).

Several species of owl including barn, African and white-faced scops, Verreaux's (giant) eagle, pearl-spotted and Pel's fishing owl occur in Mapungubwe National Park.

Kori bustards are prominent while chestnut-backed sparrow-larks and wattled starlings are nomadic, but may be abundant. Temminck's coursers and ground hornbills may also be seen in this habitat, as will a number of swallows.

The Limpopo Floodplain in flood is a paradise for aquatic birds. Grey crowned cranes, up to seven stork species and several wader, heron, crake and duck species will be seen in these wet times.

There are many stands of Lala palms and collared palm thrushes have been recorded.

Other specials that occur in Mapungubwe National Park include great white pelican, white-backed night heron, bat hawk, augur buzzard, African hobby, Dickinson's kestrel, green sandpiper, three-banded courser, blue-spotted wood dove, grey-headed parrot, Senegal coucal, pennant-winged nightjar, blue-cheeked bee-eater, broad-billed and racket-tailed roller, African golden oriole and olive-tree warbler.

Mammals
Most of the large African game species occur in Mapungubwe National Park. When the Limpopo River is not in flood, they roam freely across it to Botswana and Zimbabwe and back.

Current species include; elephant, hippopotamus, white rhinoceros, lion, leopard, cheetah, Cape wild dog, spotted hyena, brown hyena, eland, blue wildebeest, kudu, zebra, bushbuck, waterbuck, impala, klipspringer, duiker, steenbok, red hartebeest, oryx, giraffe, warthog, bush pig, aardvark and baboon.

There are numerous smaller game species, including badgers, civets, porcupine, caracal, vervet monkey, and a host of smaller species.

The wildlife park is also known to be home to at least 17 species of bats. Fruit bats are attracted to the fig trees along the Limpopo River banks, including tree roosting Wahlberg's epauletted fruit bat and the cave dwelling Egyptian fruit bat.

Since 2005, the protected area is considered a Lion Conservation Unit together with South Luangwa National Park.

Reptiles 
Rock monitor lizard, water monitor lizard, giant plated lizard, rainbow skink, ground agama and speckled thick toed gecko have all been seen in Mapungubwe National Park.
There are estimated to be at least thirty-two species of snake in the park, although only fifteen have thus far been confirmed. Some of these species include the southern African python, snouted cobra, black mamba, both horned and puff adders, and at least three species of whip or sand snakes. Nile crocodile occur in and along the Limpopo River.

Threats
The status of the park as part of the transfrontier conservation area is severely threatened by the planned exploitation of coal reserves in the immediate vicinity of the reserve. An open-cast coal mine and power plant are planned in the buffer zone of the national park, which threaten its natural and cultural value.. In addition, the large amount of water required for the mining activities will impact the ecology of a large part of the region.

See also
 Kingdom of Mapungubwe
 Mapungubwe Collection

References

External links
 

Protected areas established in 1995
National parks of South Africa